Reval is a software company. Reval’s cloud-based software provides clients with tools to manage cash and financial risks. The company is headquartered in New York City with regional offices in EMEA and APAC. Reval is led by CEO, chairman, and co-founder Jiro Okochi.

History

Reval was founded in 1999 by Jiro Okochi and Woo Song. 

In 2009, the company acquired FXpress Corporation, a leading treasury software provider to the Fortune 1000, and in 2011, acquired European treasury management provider, ecofinance.

In 2012 and 2013, Reval won Global Finance Magazine's Treasury & Cash Management Award for Best Financial Risk Management Solution. 

In October 2016, Reval was acquired by ION investment group.

Philanthropy

Little Kids Rock (LKR), a leading nonprofit provider of free musical instruments and teacher trainings to U.S. public schools, appointed Jiro Okochi to the New York Area Board of Directors to spearhead fundraising efforts for LKR’s New York metro area program.

References

External links
Official website

Risk management companies
Cloud computing providers
Technology companies of the United States